Xinzhuang is an interchange station on the Shanghai Metro. It is the southern terminus of Line 1 and the northern terminus of Line 5. It is one of the busiest stations in the Shanghai Metro, serving 230,000 passengers every day. Both Line 1 and Line 5's stations have two side platforms and two tracks, with a wall separating the Line 1 and the Line 5 platforms.

The station opened on Line 1 on 28 December 1996, with the Line 5 interchange having opened on 25 November 2003.

Station Layout

Exits
The current exits of the station are all not the original exits before the reconstruction of Xinzhuang station, and will soon be replaced with formal ones after the completion of the reconstruction.

North 1st Exit (Temporary): South of East Xinjian Road, west of South Shuiqing Road

North 2nd Exit (Temporary): South of East Xinjian Road, east of South Shuiqing Road

South Exit (Temporary): North of Xinzhu Road, northwest of Dushi Road

Bus Connections
As an important terminal of Shanghai Metro system, Xinzhuang station has various bus connections, with local bus routes connecting residence areas around, and longer-distance bus routes serving suburban districts including Fengxian, Jinshan and Songjiang.

Future Development
Xinzhuang station is now undergoing reconstruction, which is contributed by Sun Hung Kai Properties and local official developers. The reconstruction will include the building of new metro stations for Line 1 and 5, new railway station for Shanghai–Kunming Railway and Jinshan Railway and indoor bus and taxi terminals. Commercials and residences will also be built on the platform holding the new station complex.

Gallery

References

Railway stations in China opened in 1996
Railway stations in Shanghai
Shanghai Metro stations in Minhang District
Line 1, Shanghai Metro
Line 5, Shanghai Metro